Serbonnes is a commune in the Yonne department in Bourgogne-Franche-Comté in north-central France.

Personalities
Raymond Janot, a national French political figure, was mayor of Serbonnes from 1947 to 1971.

Demography

See also
Communes of the Yonne department

References

Communes of Yonne